Gottfried Benn (2 May 1886 – 7 July 1956) was a German poet, essayist, and physician. He was nominated for the Nobel Prize in Literature five times.  He was awarded the Georg Büchner Prize in 1951.

Biography and work

Family and beginnings

Gottfried Benn was born in a Lutheran country parsonage, a few hours from Berlin, the son and grandson of pastors in Mansfeld, now part of Putlitz in the district of Prignitz, Brandenburg. He was educated in Sellin in the Neumark and Frankfurt an der Oder. To please his father, he studied theology at the University of Marburg and military medicine at the Kaiser Wilhelm Academy in Berlin. After being laid off as a military doctor in 1912, Benn turned to pathology, where he dissected over 200 bodies between October 1912 and November 1913 in Berlin. Many of his literary works reflect on his time as a pathologist.

In the summer of 1912, Benn started a romantic relationship with the Jewish poet Else Lasker-Schüler.

Gottfried Benn began his literary career as a poet when he published a booklet titled Morgue and other Poems in 1912, containing expressionist poems dealing with physical decay of flesh, with blood, cancer, and death — for example No III — Cycle:

Poems like this "were received by critics and public with shock, dismay, even revulsion." In 1913 a second volume of poems came out, titled  Sons. New Poems.

Benn's poetry projects an introverted nihilism, that is, an existentialist outlook that views artistic expression as the only purposeful action. In his early poems Benn used his medical experience, often using medical terminology, to portray humanity morbidly as just another species of disease-ridden animal.

World War I and Weimar Republic

After the outbreak of World War I he enlisted in 1914, and spent a brief period on the Belgian front, then served as a military doctor in Brussels. Benn attended the court-martial and execution of Nurse and British spy Edith Cavell. He also worked as a physician in an army brothel. After the war, he returned to Berlin and practiced as a dermatologist and venereal disease specialist.

During the 1920s, he continued having a close relationship with Jewish poet Else Lasker-Schüler who addressed love poems to him. This bond to her is the subject of the film Mein Herz-niemandem (1997) by Helma Sanders-Brahms.

During the Third Reich

Hostile to the Weimar Republic, and rejecting Marxism and Americanism, Benn, like many Germans, was upset with ongoing economic and political instability, and sympathized for a short period with the Nazis as a revolutionary force. He hoped that National Socialism would exalt his aesthetics and that expressionism would become the official art of Germany, as Futurism had in Italy. Benn was elected to the poetry section of the Prussian Academy in 1932 and appointed head of that section in February 1933. In May, he defended the new regime in a radio broadcast, saying "the German workers are better off than ever before." He later signed the Gelöbnis treuester Gefolgschaft, that is, the "vow of most faithful allegiance" to Adolf Hitler.

The cultural policy of the new State didn't turn out the way he hoped, and in June Hans Friederich Blunck replaced Benn as head of the Academy's poetry section. Appalled by the Night of the Long Knives, Benn turned away from the Nazis. He lived quietly, refraining from public criticism of the Nazi Party, but wrote that the bad conditions of the system "gave me the latter punch" and stated in a letter that the developments presented a "dreadful tragedy!" He decided to perform "the aristocratic form of emigration" and joined the Wehrmacht in 1935, where he found many officers sympathetic to his disapproval of the régime. In May 1936 the SS magazine Das Schwarze Korps attacked his expressionist and experimental poetry as degenerate, Jewish, and homosexual. In the summer of 1937, Wolfgang Willrich, a member of the SS, lampooned Benn in his book Säuberung des Kunsttempels; Heinrich Himmler, however, stepped in to reprimand Willrich and defended Benn on the grounds of his good record since 1933 (his earlier artistic output being irrelevant). In 1938 the Reichsschrifttumskammer (the National Socialist authors' association) banned Benn from further writing.

After the war

During World War II, Benn was posted to garrisons in eastern Germany where he wrote poems and essays. After the war, his work was banned by the Allies because of his initial support for Hitler. In 1951 he was awarded the Georg Büchner Prize. He died of cancer in West Berlin in 1956, and was buried in Waldfriedhof Dahlem, Berlin.

Reception
Benn had a great influence on German poetry immediately before World War I (as an expressionist), as well as after World War II (as the 'Static' poet).

Books
 Morgue und andere Gedichte [Morgue and other Poems] (Berlin, 1912)
 Fleisch (1917)
 Die Gesammelten Schriften [The collected works] (Berlin, 1922)
 Schutt (1924)
 Betäubung (1925)
 Spaltung (1925)
 Nach dem Nihilismus (Berlin, 1932)
 Der Neue Staat und die Intellektuellen (1933)
 Kunst und Macht (1935)
 Ausgewählte Gedichte [Selected Poems] (May, 1936) Note: 1st edition contained two poems that were removed for the 2nd edition in November 1936: 'Mann und Frau gehen durch die Krebsbaracke' and 'D-Zug'. The vast majority of the 1st editions were collected and destroyed.
 Statische Gedichte [Static poems] (Zürich, 1948)
 Ptolemäer (Limes, 1949); Ptolemy's Disciple (edited, translated and with a preface by Simona Draghici), Plutarch Press, 2005,  (pbk).
 Doppelleben (1950); autobiography translated as Double Life (edited, translated, and with a preface by Simona Draghici, Plutarch Press, 2002).
 Stimme hinter dem Vorhang; translated as The Voice Behind the Screen (translated with an introduction by Simona Draghici (Plutarch Press, 1996).

Collections
 Sämtliche Werke ("Stuttgarter Ausgabe"), ed. by Gerhard Schuster and Holger Hof, 7 volumes in 8 parts, (Stuttgart 1986–2003).
 Prose, Essays, Poems by Gottfried Benn, edited by Volkmar Sander; introduction by Reinhard Paul Becker (Continuum International Publishing Group, 1987,  &  (pbk.)
 Selected Poems (Clarendon German series) by Gottfried Benn (Oxford U.P., 1970)
 Gottfried Benn in Transition by Gottfried Benn, edited by Simona Draghici (Plutarch Press, 2003)
 Poems, 1937–1947 (Plutarch Press, 1991)
 Impromptus (Farrar, Straus and Giroux, 2013)
 Gottfried Benn – Friedrich Wilhelm Oelze: Briefwechsel 1932–1956, edited by Harald Steinhagen, Stephan Kraft and Holger Hof, 4 volumes, (Klett-Cotta/Wallstein)

Notes

References
 German Dreams and German Dreamers: Gottfried Benn's German Universe by Henry Grosshans (Wyndham Hall Press, 1987,  (pbk.).
 Gottfried Benn: The Unreconstructed Expressionist by J. M. Ritchie (London: Wolff, 1972, .
 Beyond Nihilism: Gottfried Benn's Postmodernist Poetics by Susan Ray (Oxford; New York: P. Lang, 2003,  &  (pbk.).
 Gottfried Benn's Static Poetry: Aesthetic and Intellectual-Historical Interpretations by Mark William Roche (University of North Carolina Press, 1991, .
 Primal Vision: Selected Poetry and Prose of Gottfried Benn edited by E. B. Ashton (NY: Bodley Head, 1961; Boyars, 1971; Marion Boyars, 1984, 
 Twentieth-Century Culture: A Biographical Companion edited by Alan Bullock and R. B. Woodings (Harpercollins, 1984, 
 Gottfried Benn and his Critics: Major Interpretations 1912–1992 by Augustinus P. Dierick. [Columbia SC: Camden House Inc.], 1992.
 German Literature Under National Socialism by J. M. Ritchie (London: C. Helm; Barnes & Noble, 1983, .
 The Appeal of Fascism: A Study of Intellectuals and Fascism, 1919–1945 by Alastair Hamilton, foreword by Stephen Spender (London: Blond, 1971, .
 Biographical Dictionary of the Extreme Right Since 1890 by Philip Rees (New York: Simon & Schuster, 1990).
 Reason and Energy: Studies in German Literature by Michael Hamburger (London: Routledge & Paul, 1957; New York: Grove Press, 1957; London: Weidenfeld & Nicolson, 1970, revised ed., .
 Encyclopedia of the Third Reich by Louis Leo Snyder (New York: McGraw-Hill, 1976, ; London: Blandford, 1989, ; New York: Paragon House, 1989, 1st pbk. ed., ; New York: Marlowe, 1998, 
 Snow from Broken Eyes: Cocaine in the Lives and Works of Three Expressionist Poets, Richard Millington, (Peter Lang AG, 2012)
 “Das Ich ist ein Phantom.” The Crisis of Cartesianism and its Transcendence in Myth in Gottfried Benn’s Early Dramas.” by Augustinus P. Dierick. In: Analogon Rationis. Festschrift für Gerwin Mahrarens zum 65. Geburtstag. Ed. Marianne Henn and Christoph Lorey. Edmonton: University of Alberta Press, 1994, 357-389.

External links

 
 
 Translation of Astern/Asters
 
 Gottfried Benn Society, German language site
 Latently existing words

1886 births
1956 deaths
People from Prignitz
People from the Province of Brandenburg
Expressionist poets
German Expressionist writers
Writers from Brandenburg
Georg Büchner Prize winners
Modernist writers
German military personnel of World War II
Officers Crosses of the Order of Merit of the Federal Republic of Germany
20th-century German poets
Recipients of the Iron Cross (1914), 2nd class
University of Marburg alumni
German male poets
German male essayists
German essayists
Deaths from cancer in Germany
German-language poets
20th-century essayists
20th-century German male writers
Philosophical pessimists
German military personnel of World War I
Members of the German Academy for Language and Literature